Kazi Nabil Ahmed (born 4 October 1969) is a Bangladesh Awami League politician and the incumbent Jatiya Sangsad member representing the Jessore-3 constituency since 2014. Ahmed is the current vice president of the Bangladesh Football Federation and the chairman of National Team's Committee as of December 2020. He is a Director of Gemcon Group.

Early life 
Ahmed was born on 4 October 1969. He has a Masters of Science degree.

Career
Ahmed served as the director of Kazi & Kazi Tea Estate Limited in 2003.

Ahmed was the chairperson of National Teams Committee in 2012.

Ahmed was elected to Parliament from Jessore-3 unopposed as an Awami League candidate in an election boycotted by all major political parties.

In 2016, Ahmed was the President of Bangladesh Football Federation. He was elected Vice-President of Bangladesh Football Federation in that years election.

Ahmed was nominated by Awami League to contest from Jessore-3 in 2018. Ahmed was re-elected in the election. He got 361 thousand votes which is about 330 thousand more votes than his closest opponent, Anindya Islam Amit of Bangladesh Nationalist Party, who received 31 thousand votes.

Ahmed is the director-in-charge of Abahani Limited Dhaka. He stated that for the development of Bangladesh there was no alternative to Sheikh Hasina in January 2021 at a program in Jessore. On 7 February 2021, he took the first COVID-19 vaccine in Jessore District and started the vaccination process.

References

Living people
1969 births
Bangladeshi businesspeople
Awami League politicians
11th Jatiya Sangsad members
10th Jatiya Sangsad members